Zaki Nassif (4 July 1918 – 10 March 2004) was a Lebanese music composer and singer. He was influential among the first generation of composers for the mass audience for music on radio in Lebanon in the 1940s and 1950s, and continued to be a force in Lebanese music until his death in 2004. His compositions continue to be performed in Lebanon today.

Biography
Born in Machghara, the largest town in the western Beqaa Valley in 1918 and was involved in music and country folk poetry (zagal, maannaa, 'ataba, mijana, abu el zuluf, etc.) at an early age. He was one of the Big Five who contributed material to Radio Orient and Radio Liban in the 1950s (among whom were Halim El Roumi, father of Magida El Roumi, and Tawfic al Basha, Phélémone Wehbé, etc.). During the 1990s he did singing performances on multiple primetime television entertainment shows in Lebanon. On his 85th birthday he was interviewed at length in Lebanon by various mass media venues. Despite his popularity, Zaki Nassif remained a man with limited income, as his 60 years in the music industry did not win him a rich living. This is the case with many Lebanese musicians. Zaki Nassif is still popular in many Arab countries, specially Lebanon.

Music
Nassif does not belong to the Rahbani School of music that married western classical and folk music with old Lebanese traditional gigs. Rather, he remained with the old material but with a fresh spirit of the Lebanese country side.

The lyrics of his songs are very often of the patriotic kind (Baladi Habibi, Ya Daya'ati- my village, etc.). When his recordings are played on Lebanese TV stations, it is always along with scenery from Lebanon. Zaki Nassif is remembered during the civil war for his anthem song "Rajeh Yittammar" (Lebanon will be rebuilt) at a time when violence and destruction were the rule rather than the exception in Lebanon. The song is upbeat and inspires patriotism and is recommended as a staple Zaki Nassif's material.

Zaki Nassif had many protégé new singers to whom he composed material suitable for their vocal abilities.

In 1995, to the surprise of many who thought that Zaki Nassif could not produce new material, Zaki Nassif composed a full album for Fairuz (Fairuz Chante Zaki Nassif, Voix de l'Orient label). The CD contains excellent material that shows the variety of expression Zaki Nassif had. Watch for the Andalusian passages, the poem by Gibran Khalil Gibran (Ya Bani Oummi) and its entry piece, or the love song Ahwak.

Albums
Zaki Nassif's albums are readily available. He is a household name in Lebanon. There are at least four CDs of re-issued recordings in relatively recent years on the Voix de l'Orient label. Zaki Nassif's CDs have over 20 songs or 70 minutes. This is similar to reissues of Fairuz's old material, re-issued by the same company.

Death
Zaki Nassif died in Beirut on 10 March 2004 from a heart attack.

See Also 

 Rahbani brothers
 Assi Rahbani
 Mansour Rahbani
 Fairuz
 Wadih El Safi
 Wadih El Safi
 List of Lebanese people

References 

1918 births
2004 deaths
Lebanese composers
20th-century Lebanese male singers
People from Machghara
Performers of Christian music in Arabic